Rude boy is a subculture that developed in the early 1960s in Jamaica.

Rude boy or Rude boys may also refer to:

Film and TV
Rude Boy (film), a 1980 film about a roadie for The Clash
Rudeboy, a fictional website at the center of the 2003-2006 British children's TV series Kerching!
Rudeboy: The Story of Trojan Records, a 2018 documentary film about Trojan Records by Nicolas Jack Davies

Sports
Troy Mandaloniz, a.k.a. "Rude Boy", Mixed Martial Artist and contestant on The Ultimate Fighter: Team Hughes vs Team Serra

Music
Rudeboy, born Patrick Tilon, Dutch rapper formerly of Urban Dance Squad
The Rude Boys, a 1980s and 1990s R&B/vocal group from Cleveland, Ohio
Rude Boy Records, a European independent record label
The Original Rudeboys, Irish acoustic hip-hop band
Rudeboy (singer), born 1981

Albums
Rude Boy, a VHS later DVD, album by The Clash 1980
Rude Boy, Exuma 1986
Rude Boy, Horace Andy 1993
Rude Boy, Lieutenant Stitchie 1993
The Original Rude Boy, Desmond Dekker 1997
Rude Boy Ska, Desmond Dekker 2000

Songs
"Rude Boy" (Bob Marley song), 1964
"Rude Boy" (Rihanna song), 2009
"Rudeboy" (Sigma song), 2013
"Rude Boy", a song by Quiet Riot from Terrified
"Rude Boy", a song by Shabba Ranks, written by Danny Browne and Rexton Gordon, from X-tra Naked
"Rude Boy", a song by Uptones
"Rudeboy", single by Zeds Dead
"Rudeboy", by The Very Best from MTMTMK
"Rudeboy", by Aswad from Aswad vs. the Rhythm Riders
"Rude Boys (Back In Town)", by Michael Rose from Be Yourself
"Rude Boys", by Black Kids
"Staring At The Rude Boys", by The Ruts

See also
 Rude (disambiguation)